Maxime Estève (born 26 May 2002) is a French professional footballer who plays as a centre-back for Montpellier.

Career
A youth product of AS Canet and Montpellier, Estève signed his first aspirant contract with Montpellier on 19 November 2019. He made his professional debut with Montpellier in a 3–2 Ligue 1 loss to Olympique de Marseille on 8 August 2021. On 23 September 2021, he signed his first professional contract with the club.

International career
Estève is a youth international for France, having played for the France U20s.

References

External links
 
 
 MHSC Foot Profile
 
 FFF Profile

2002 births
Living people
Footballers from Montpellier
French footballers
France youth international footballers
Association football defenders
Ligue 1 players
Championnat National 2 players
Championnat National 3 players
Montpellier HSC players